People v. Jackson (full title: 1133603: The People of the State of California v. Michael Joe Jackson) was a 2005 criminal trial held in Santa Barbara County Superior Court in Santa Maria, California. The American singer-songwriter Michael Jackson was charged with molesting Gavin Arvizo, who was 13 years old at the time of the alleged abuse, at his Neverland Ranch estate in Los Olivos, California.

Jackson had previously been accused of child sexual abuse in 1993; he denied the allegations and settled the accuser's civil lawsuit. In 2003, the documentary Living with Michael Jackson showed Jackson holding hands with Arvizo and defending his practice of giving his bed to children, triggering an investigation. Jackson was indicted on four counts of molesting a minor, four counts of intoxicating a minor to molest him, one count of attempted child molestation, one count of conspiring to hold Gavin and his family captive, and conspiring to commit extortion and child abduction.

The trial spanned approximately four months, beginning with jury selection that began on January 31, 2005. Gavin and his brother testified that Jackson had given them alcohol, showed them pornography, masturbated before them and made sexual advances. The defense characterized the witnesses for the prosecution as disgruntled ex-employees or individuals seeking to exploit Jackson for money. Witnesses for the defense included testimony from celebrities including the former child actor Macaulay Culkin and the comedian Chris Tucker. Coverage of the trial was described as a media circus, and some media outlets were quick to portray Jackson as guilty.

Jackson was acquitted on all counts on June 13, 2005. He never returned to Neverland Ranch, and spent the first several months after the trial living abroad in Bahrain and Ireland. In 2013, four years after Jackson's death, one of the defense witnesses, Wade Robson, changed his position and filed a lawsuit, saying he had been abused by Jackson. Jurors of the trial who appeared on The Jury Speaks in 2017 said they still would vote to acquit.

Background

In 1993, the American pop singer Michael Jackson was accused of child sexual abuse by a 13-year-old boy, Jordan Chandler. The abuse allegedly took place at Jackson's Neverland Ranch home in Santa Barbara, California. In January 1994, Jackson settled the lawsuit made against him for $23 million, with $5 million going to the family's lawyers. The settlement was not an admission of guilt; Jackson said he had settled to prevent the lawsuit interfering with his career, which he later regretted. Prosecutors pursued the criminal case and presented the evidence to two separate grand juries, neither of which indicted.

In 2000, the child cancer patient Gavin Arvizo was introduced to Jackson by the businessman and comedian Jamie Masada. Gavin's father, David Arvizo, who was separated from Arvizo's mother, often asked celebrities for money to support his son's cancer treatments. Gavin was receiving chemotherapy and required the removal of his spleen and left kidney. Jackson and Gavin became friends, and Jackson invited Gavin and his family to Neverland Ranch. Gavin thanked Jackson for "helping [him] be happy and beat cancer". According to Gavin, after a few visits to Neverland, Jackson suddenly stopped calling him; Gavin said he felt abandoned.

In 2002, Jackson invited Gavin, now 12 years old, to be a part of an ITV documentary, Living with Michael Jackson. The presenter, Martin Bashir, interviewed Jackson over eight months for the film. Jackson and Gavin were seen holding hands, and Bashir asked Jackson about the appropriateness of a grown man having sleepovers and sharing a bed with a young person.  Note that by "sharing", Jackson clarified that he allowed guests to sleep in his bed alone while he slept on the floor, saying, "You can have my bed if you want, sleep in it, I'll sleep on the floor."  Jackson also insisted that it was not sexual. He said it was a "beautiful thing", and that he had shared his bed with many children, including actors Macaulay and Kieran Culkin. 

The film drew controversy and calls for Jackson's children to be removed from his custody. Jackson called the documentary deceptive and a "gross distortion of the truth". Gavin's mother, Janet Arvizo, said it misrepresented her son's relationship with Jackson; she instructed Theodore Goddard, the London law firm, to file complaints against the Independent Television Commission, which oversees ITV. Bashir defended his interview, saying: "Here's an individual who is 44 years old, sleeping in the bed of children who have no biological relationship with him. I did not set out to ensnare him with a child."

Jackson's production team recorded a two-hour rebuttal film, The Michael Jackson Interview: The Footage You Were Never Meant to See, which was screened by Fox Television. Jackson decided to release the film after feeling betrayed by Bashir. Macaulay Culkin appeared on Larry King Live to defend Jackson, saying nothing inappropriate had occurred at Neverland Ranch. He said: "Michael Jackson's bedroom is two stories and has three bathrooms. When I slept in his bedroom, you have to understand the whole scenario. The thing is that, with Michael, he isn't very good at explaining himself."

Gloria Gruber, president of Prevent Child Abuse California, called for authorities to interview the children with whom he had shared his bed, saying: "The fact that he sleeps with children who are unrelated to him is definitely a red flag and concern." Santa Barbara district attorney Tom Sneddon, who had attempted to bring Jackson to trial over the 1993 allegations, initially said that, under Californian law, sleeping with a child without "affirmative, offensive conduct" was not illegal, and "sleeping in bed with a kid is not a crime that I know of".

Investigation and arrest 

From February 14 to February 27, 2003, a few weeks after the broadcast of the documentary, the Los Angeles Department of Child and Family Services conducted a preliminary investigation of Jackson and Gavin. In a confidential report based on interviews with the Arvizos, which leaked to the media, child welfare officials stated that they believed that accusations of illicit conduct were unfounded.

In June 2003, Sneddon reopened the investigation. In July and August, he interviewed Gavin along with his father David, mother Janet, and younger brother Star. In November, Gavin told police that Jackson had molested him several times between February 7 and March 10, 2003, when, according to Janet, Jackson had held the family captive at Neverland. This timeline was revised in the grand jury indictment, which stated that the alleged acts of molestation occurred between February 21 and March 12, 2003.

On November 18, 2003, police searched Neverland Ranch with a search warrant. Jackson and his three children were in Las Vegas, where Jackson was shooting a music video for his single "One More Chance". Jackson was arrested on November 20. He was released an hour later after posting a $3 million bond.

Shortly after the arrest, Jackson issued a statement saying the claims were "predicated on a big lie". In an interview with the news program 60 Minutes, Jackson said the police had mistreated him and complained of a dislocated shoulder. He reaffirmed his innocence and said that he was determined not to settle out of court as he had done in 1993. In August 2004, the California attorney general's office concluded, after an independent investigation, that Jackson was neither "manhandled" nor mistreated when he was taken into custody.

On December 18, 2003, Jackson was charged with seven counts of child molestation and two counts of administering an intoxicating agent for the purpose of committing a felony. On January 16, 2004, the day of his arraignment, Jackson climbed on top of his car to dance and wave to fans. On April 21, a grand jury indicted Jackson on several additional related charges, including conspiracy involving child abduction, false imprisonment, and extortion. Jackson pleaded not guilty on April 30. He faced a sentence of up to eighteen years in prison if convicted at trial.

Trial

The trial began on February 28, 2005 in the courthouse of Santa Maria, Santa Barbara. Santa Barbara County Judge Rodney Melville presided over the trial. Melville, who had a contentious relationship with the news media, banned cameras from the courtroom and put a gag order on both sides. He delayed the three-day jury selection process for a week while Jackson was hospitalized, reportedly with flu.

Sneddon led the prosecution. Jackson's legal team attempted to have him and his staff disqualified from the trial, citing bias following his attempts to prosecute Jackson in 1993; Melville dismissed the attempts. The defense was led by the celebrity lawyer Thomas Mesereau.

Melville allowed prosecutors to introduce testimony about past allegations against Jackson, including the 1993 case, to establish whether Jackson had a propensity to commit such crimes. The prosecution hoped to show that Jackson had engaged in a pattern of sexual abuse with boys. They called on witnesses to describe earlier incidents, including Jackson's alleged 1993 abuse of Jordan Chandler. The prosecution argued that Jackson used Neverland, his "fantasy hideaway" with candy and theme park attractions, to lure boys and groom them into sex, and flattered their parents with gifts. The prosecution also said that, after Living With Michael Jackson aired, Jackson and his entourage had attempted to hold the Arvizo family virtually captive at Neverland and force them to participate in a rebuttal film.

On March 10, as Gavin Arvizo was about to testify, Jackson was absent from court. Judge Melville issued a warrant for his arrest and said Jackson's $3 million bond would be forfeited if he did not arrive within an hour. Jackson arrived an hour and ten minutes late and appeared to weep in court. In an interview shortly afterwards, he said he had slipped in the shower and bruised his lung "very badly". He said the ongoing trial had been the lowest period in his life, and denied rumors about his financial problems, saying they were part of a smear campaign.

Witnesses for the prosecution

Martin Bashir 
On March 1, the British journalist Martin Bashir, who had interviewed Jackson for Living with Michael Jackson, took to the witness stand while prosecutors showed the documentary to jurors. Bashir refused to answer questions from defense attorneys.

Jason Francia 
On April 4, Jason Francia, whose mother worked as a maid at Neverland Ranch, testified that Jackson had abused him on several occasions when he was seven to ten years old. Francia said that "every time I was being tickled there was some sort of exchange of money", done with the understanding that he would not tell his mother. His mother said she had reached an out-of-court settlement with Jackson, reportedly for $2 million. She sold her stories to the tabloid National Enquirer and the television show Hard Copy.

On cross-examination, Francia acknowledged that in his first 1993 interview he told detectives Jackson had not molested him. He said he had denied being improperly touched by Jackson because he did not want to be embarrassed at school. He said he went into counseling until he was eighteen years old. Mesereau sought to establish that the Francias were goaded into their accusations by overzealous prosecutors and tempted by money offered for media interviews.

Neverland Ranch staff 
In April 2005, Ralph Chacon, a former security guard at Neverland Ranch, testified that he had seen Jackson performing oral sex on Chandler in the early 1990s. He also described seeing Jackson passionately kiss Chandler and place his hand on Chandler's crotch. He said he did not report the incident to police because he thought he would not be believed. A former maid at the ranch, Adrian McManus, testified that she had seen Jackson kissing boys including the actor Macaulay Culkin, and described Jackson touching Culkin's leg and rear. She told the court that she had seen Jackson touching Chandler's genitals. Culkin denied being molested by Jackson. Macaulay Culkin has always denied being sexually abused by Jackson.

The defense sought to portray Chacon and McManus as unreliable. According to The Observer, each witness had a "horrific story ... Yet, rather than calling the police, each appears to have sold that story to a supermarket tabloid." McManus had previously denied witnessing misconduct from Jackson in a 1993 court deposition while under oath. In the 2005 trial, she said she had lied during the deposition because she feared Jackson would report her to her superiors if she told police about the incident. In the 1990s, Chacon and McManus had been part of a lawsuit filed against Jackson for wrongful dismissal. After Jackson counter-sued, their lawsuit was thrown out as fraudulent and malicious. According to testimony, Chacon and McManus had been found guilty of stealing items from Jackson's house amounting to more than $50,000 and ordered to pay more than $1 million in legal fees. Under cross-examination, the pair affirmed they had been paid for media interviews. McManus also acknowledged she and her husband were found to have previously defrauded a relative's children and had stolen a sketch by Jackson worth $35,000. Mesereau accused the pair of attempting to "get even" with Jackson for the failed suit and characterized them as money-seekers.

Housekeeper Kiki Fournier testified that the Arvizo children became unruly at Neverland Ranch without authority figures. She said the Arvizo boys "trashed" their guest rooms, and that at one point Star had pointed a knife at her in Jackson's kitchen. She said that although the boys had guest rooms they would often stay with Jackson. However, she said she never saw Jackson giving the boys alcohol and never saw them drunk.

Cynthia Bell, a flight attendant who had served Jackson, testified that she never saw him share his drink with Gavin. She said she had devised the custom of serving Jackson wine in soda cans because Jackson did not like to drink alcohol in front of his children. Bell said she had not seen Jackson "cuddling" with Gavin during the flight, but testified that she had seen Jackson put his arm around him while he was listening to music. She said that Gavin was demanding, complained about the food, and was unruly during the flight.

Phillip LeMarque, Jackson's cook, said he entered Jackson's room and saw Jackson with his hand in Culkin's underpants. LeMarque and his wife, also a Jackson employee, had considered selling the story to a tabloid, but had backed out as the intermediary was "sleazy".  LeMarque said he had decided not to sell because it was "against our principles".

Jesús Salas, a former house manager at the Neverland Ranch, testified that he often saw Jackson drunk or affected by prescription drugs, and once saw three teenage boys emerging drunk from the wine cellar after having spent time with Jackson. When the prosecution attempted to confirm Jackson had served wine to minors, Salas said that although he brought a bottle of wine to Jackson's bedroom, sodas were also ordered for the children.

The judge ruled out testimony from a former security guard who alleged that he saw Jackson in his bedroom with a boy.

June Chandler 
Jordan Chandler, the alleged victim in the 1993 child abuse allegations, left the country rather than appear as a witness. He had been legally emancipated from his parents.

Chandler's mother, June Chandler, testified that Jordan complained that she would not allow him to spend time in Jackson’s bedroom. This appeared to upset Jackson, who had formed a bond with June and her children. June said Jackson asked her: "You don’t trust me? We’re a family. Why are you doing this?" She responded that Jordan should be allowed to sleep where he wanted, indicating a change of mind. Chandler testified that she had never suspected anything inappropriate between Jackson and Jordan. She told the court that she had not spoken to Jordan in eleven years.

Debbie Rowe 
On April 28, Jackson's ex-wife Debbie Rowe was called on the witness stand. The prosecution claimed that Rowe was forced into a scripted videotaped statement made in early 2003 in support of Jackson. The prosecution had hoped Rowe's testimony would support Janet Arvizo's claim that they were held captive and forced to make supportive statements about Jackson. In her second day of testimony, Rowe said she had refused to look at the questions before the taping and was eager to support Jackson. The defense initially wanted Rowe dismissed, saying she was not providing the testimony the prosecution wanted. The judge allowed her testimony, and the defense withdrew their motion that she refused to speak in favor of the defense. According to several sources and leaked documents, this has been proved false.  Rowe described Jackson's business associates and public relations aides Marc Schaffel, Dieter Wiesner and Ronald Konitzer as "opportunistic vultures" who wanted to exploit him.

Gavin Arvizo 
Gavin Arvizo was 15 years old when he testified. He told the court that, after Living with Michael Jackson aired, Jackson had begun serving him and his younger brother wine, sometimes concealed in soda cans, showing them pornography and making sexual advances. He said that Jackson had masturbated him to ejaculation after they drank alcohol, and then told him that if men do not masturbate, they "might rape a girl". Challenged by Mesereau, who said that Gavin had told sheriffs that his grandmother had said this, Gavin said he was not sure what his grandmother had told him. Gavin also testified he had told his school administrator that Jackson had not molested him.

Star Arvizo 
Gavin's younger brother, Star, told the court that he had twice seen Jackson molest Gavin. He also said that Jackson had displayed his erection and masturbated in front of them, telling them that "everyone did it", and encouraged them to try it. Star testified that Jackson had given the boys alcohol, sometimes in soda cans, which Jackson called "Jesus juice". Star also said Jackson had showed the brothers internet pornography on his computer.

On cross-examination, Mesereau questioned Star about a 1998 case in which his family sued J. C. Penney. The family alleged that Star, his brother and their mother were beaten in a parking lot by security guards after leaving with clothes they had not paid for. Janet Arvizo also claimed to have been sexually assaulted and falsely imprisoned. The family received a settlement of £75,000. In a 2000 sworn statement for the case, Star had said his "mother and father never [fought]." Janet and her children claimed that David Arvizo physically abused them for seventeen years. Star admitted he lied in the statement. The admission was a major victory to the defense. Also, it was stated that the Arvizos had not visited Neverland since March 2003. However, when shown a pornographic magazine dated August 2003, 5 months after the family stopped visiting Neverland, Star claimed that was one of the magazines Jackson had shown them. Star would later attempt to recant this testimony too.

Janet Arvizo 
The defense sought to portray Janet Arvizo as untrustworthy, with a history of perjury and fraud. She admitted to having lied under oath in an earlier lawsuit. The prosecution planned to have an expert on domestic violence testify that she may have lied because she had been beaten by her ex-husband, but the judge did not allow it, saying it would be irrelevant. The defense also presented evidence of Janet having committed welfare fraud, for which she was later convicted.

In regards to the J.C. Penney case, which eventually settled for $152,000, the defense brought in a welfare worker who stated that Janet had failed to disclose her receipt of the settlement that her family had received days before filling out a welfare application. A paralegal testified that Janet had lied to win that lawsuit, claiming that bruises caused by her then-husband had been caused by J.C. Penney security guards.

Connie Keenan, the editor of the Mid Valley News, said she was "duped" by Janet into writing a story about Gavin's sickness because the original story did not make enough money. Other witnesses for the defense showed Janet had spent $7,000 shopping and dining out at the same time she alleged Jackson kept her and her family captive. Janet's sister-in-law offered to help Arvizo's treatment by holding blood donation campaigns. She said Janet swore at her and rejected the offer.

Jurors described Janet's testimony as weak. They also found it strange that she snapped her fingers and addressed them directly. The New York Times described her testimony as "rambling, incoherent and at times combative". One juror questioned Janet's values as a mother, believing she had taught her children to lie to gain money and favors from celebrities.

Witnesses for the defense 
According to Jackson's defense attorney Susan Yu, over five hundred witnesses were prepared in the case.

Macaulay Culkin 
The former child star Macaulay Culkin testified that he had shared a bed with Jackson on a dozen or more times between the ages of nine and 14, but had never been molested and had never seen Jackson act improperly, contrary to many of the prosecution's witness testimonies. He said that his parents had known he was in Jackson's bedroom and "never saw it as an issue". He described shock at hearing allegations that Jackson had molested him, and dismissed them as "absolutely ridiculous". Culkin said they had bonded over their shared experience of child stardom. Culkin has consistently defended Jackson since, and said in a 2020 interview with Esquire: "I never saw anything; he never did anything."

Wade Robson 
Wade Robson testified as Jackson's first defense witness that he had slept in Jackson's bedroom several times but had never been molested. Robson recalled his first visit at Neverland Ranch in 1989 and had slept in Jackson's bedroom on all but three or four of his twenty or so visits. He said they played video games, watched movies, talked and sometimes had pillow fights.

Brett Barnes 
Barnes first met Jackson at the age of five when Jackson went to Australia during one of his tours. He shared a bedroom with Jackson at least ten times but denied any impropriety. Barnes was aware of the prosecutor's witness testimonies claiming they had seen Jackson touch him inappropriately. In response, Barnes said, "I'm very mad about it. It's not true and they put my name through the dirt. I'm really not happy about it." In 2019, Barnes restated his denial of any molestation.

George Lopez 
The comedian George Lopez testified that he had given the Arvizo family money when Gavin was fighting cancer, but came to believe that Gavin's father was more interested in money than helping his son. Lopez cut ties with the family after the father became more demanding. Lopez also said that the father had accused him of stealing $300 from Gavin's wallet. When the father asked what he was supposed to tell his son, Lopez testified that he responded: "Tell him his father's an extortionist."

Jay Leno 
The talk show host Jay Leno testified about his relationship with the Arvizo family. Leno made approximately 20 phone calls to sick children each week, and began receiving voicemail messages from Gavin, then a ten-year-old cancer patient, in 2000. Gavin called Leno "his hero", which Leno felt was unusual as "I'm not Batman... It sounded suspicious when a young person got overly effusive." Leno also said he heard another voice in the background of one call; the defense argued that this was Janet telling Gavin what to say.

Chris Tucker 
The comedian Chris Tucker said he had felt sorry for the Arvizos, and he had given them money and gifts. He felt the Arvizos expected too much, calling him their "brother" and taking advantage of him. He testified that he had warned Jackson about the family, whom he called "cunning".

1994 settlement 
The judge allowed investigation evidence from Jackson's previous allegations to be used in the trial, but the 1994 settlement initiated by the Chandlers was deemed "irrelevant and inflammatory". The prosecution attempted to subpoena evidence from the settlement as an indication of guilt. Mesereau argued that Jackson was not liable for any of the claims compromised by the arrangement, because Jackson's insurance company, Transamerica Insurance Group, was responsible for it. The insurance company negotiated the settlement over protests from Jackson and his legal counsel. The settlement included no admission of wrongdoing or guilt, otherwise, it would violate the California Insurance Code. The insurance company had "the right to settle claims covered by insurance where it decides settlement is expedient and the insured may not interfere with nor prevent such settlements," a practice established by several precedents in California. Evidence of insurance settlements would deprive Jackson of due process of law, proper cross-examination and violate Evidence Code 352 as he would not be able to verify the agreements made in the settlement. The settlement cannot be used as evidence of guilt in future civil and criminal cases.

The settlement cannot prevent criminal investigation or criminal proceeding, neither can non-disclosure agreements. Bribery to not testify in a trial is felony, and accepting such bribes is also a felony.

Verdict
The jury deliberated for about 32 hours over seven days. On the initial vote, nine jurors voted to acquit Jackson, while three voted guilty. On June 13, 2005, they returned a verdict of not guilty on all charges. Jurors found the prosecution's case weak and the timeline of accusations problematic because they had claimed the molestation allegedly occurred after the broadcast of the documentary, when the world's attention was on Jackson and Gavin. One juror believed the mother was a scam artist.

In a news conference held after the trial, a juror said, "We expected better evidence, something that was a little more convincing. It just wasn't there." Sneddon suggested that Jackson’s celebrity status and the media had influenced the verdict. The jury foreman, a retired high school counselor, said, "We looked at all the evidence and we looked at Michael Jackson and one of the first things we decided was we had to look at him just as another person and not a celebrity."

Media coverage

The trial attracted international media attention, and several commentators described it as a media circus.  When news of the raid on Jackson's home broke, many channels switched to 24-hour rolling coverage; CBS, NBC, ABC and VH1 produced television specials. The media covered Jackson's health, dress and behavior, such as when he hopped on top of a car and waved to fans. The networks E! and Sky TV collaborated to produce re-enactments of highlights from the trial, which were broadcast daily. The re-enactment used look-alike actors, with impersonator Edward Moss portraying Jackson.

In 2010, the British journalist Charles Thomson described the trial as "one of the most shameful episodes in journalistic history". He said the media coverage was "out of control ... The sheer amount of propaganda, bias, distortion, and misinformation is almost beyond comprehension." The Huffington Post contributor Luka Neskovic wrote that the trial "displayed media at their worst", with "sensationalism, exclusivity, negativity, eccentrics, chaos, and hysteria". For example, according to Neskovic, when pornography was found in Jackson's home, many media outlets misreported it as child pornography. Neskovic observed that the media was more interested in reporting the prosecution than the defense, and that, for example, The Hollywood Reporter chose not to report two weeks of the defense case.

Aftermath 
Following the trial, Mesereau said Jackson would no longer allow people to enter in his room and would no longer "easily allow people to enter his life", as he had become a target for "people who want to extract money or build careers". Jackson moved to the Persian Gulf island country of Bahrain as a guest of Sheikh Abdullah. According to Jackson's brother Jermaine, unbeknownst to Jackson, the family had intended to send him to Bahrain had he been convicted. Jackson then lived in Ireland. He never returned to Neverland Ranch, saying it had been despoiled by police searches. 

The allegations continued to affect Jackson's career. Despite selling out a series of concerts in 2009, he was unable to find sponsors or merchandise partners. A judge observed in 2021 that "the fact that he earned not a penny from his image and likeness in 2006, 2007, or 2008 shows the effect those allegations had, and continued to have, until his death". 

In June 2009, Jackson died of acute propofol and benzodiazepine intoxication at his home in Holmby Hills, Los Angeles. After Jackson's death in 2009, Bashir told ABC News that he never saw any wrongdoing on Jackson's part, and said he felt Jackson's life had been "unorthodox" but not criminal. FBI files released after Jackson's death noted that there were no outstanding leads or evidence items.

Further allegations 
 
In 2013, choreographer Wade Robson, who had testified in the trial that Jackson had not molested him, filed a $1.5 billion lawsuit against Jackson's estate, claiming Jackson had molested him over seven years when he was a child. In May 2015, Judge Mitchell Beckloff dismissed the lawsuit against Jackson's estate, saying Robson's claim was "untimely". Robson also filed a suit against Jackson's corporations, which was dismissed in 2017 when the judge ruled that Jackson's corporations could not be held responsible for Robson's exposure to Jackson.

In 2014, another man who had spent time with Jackson as a child, James Safechuck, filed suit with the same lawyer as Robson against Jackson's corporations. Safechuck had given sworn testimony during Jackson's 1993 allegations that he had never been molested, and said that he realized he had been abused when he heard Robson's allegations. He alleged that he had been sexually abused by Jackson more than 100 times in four years, and that he had been "brainwashed" into believing the incidents were "acts of love". In 2017, his lawsuit was dismissed by a probate court as time-barred. In a 2017 episode of the true crime series The Jury Speaks, the four featured jurors of the Jackson trial said they would still vote to acquit Jackson.

In March 2019, a documentary about their allegations, Leaving Neverland, aired, triggering further examination of Jackson's legacy. In January 2020, Robson's and Safechuck's lawsuits against Jackson's corporations were revived by a California appeals court after California expanded the statute of limitations for child sexual abuse lawsuits.  In October 2020, Safechuck's lawsuit against Jackson's corporations were dismissed; the presiding judge ruled that there was no evidence that he had a relationship with Jackson's companies or that they had any legal duty of care to protect him from the alleged molestation. In April 2021, Robson's lawsuit against Jackson's businesses was dismissed by the L.A. County Superior Court for the same reason. Robson's attorneys said they plan to appeal the ruling.

Notes

References

Bibliography
Newberg, Debra. "Reflections and Corrections on Michael Jackson – America in the Mirror", 2010. 9780615320793, published by Newberg and Personal Promotions

2005 in California
2005 in United States case law
2000s trials
21st-century American trials
Criminal trials that ended in acquittal
Trial
Santa Maria, California
Sex crime trials
False allegations of sex crimes
Media bias controversies